Westphal or Westphall may refer to the following people:

Ari Westphal (born 1994), Brazilian fashion model
Bernd Westphal (born 1960), German politician
Brigitta Westphal (born 1944), German painter
Carlo Westphal (born 1985), German professional road bicycle racer
Christoph Westphal, pharmaceutical executive 
Daniel Westphal, Northern Mariana Islander footballer 
Dirk Westphal (born 1963), American artist
Edwin Westphal (born 1966), Guatemalan former professional football forward
Ernst Oswald Johannes Westphal (1919–1990), South African linguist
Euler Renato Westphal, Brazilian Lutheran theologian
Frank Westphal, (1889–1948), American musician
George Augustus Westphal (1785–1875), English Royal Navy officer
Gert Westphal (1920–2002), German-Swiss actor, recitator and director
Heidi Westphal, German rower and Olympic medalist
J. G. Westphal (1824–1859), German astronomer and mathematician
James Westphal (1930–2004), American academic, scientist, engineer, inventor and astronomer
James D. Westphal, American business professor
Joachim Westphal (of Eisleben) (died 1569), Lutheran theologian
Joachim Westphal (of Hamburg) (c. 1510–1574), Lutheran theologian
Johann Heinrich Westphal (1794–1831), German astronomer
Jonathan Westphal (born 1951), philosopher
Joseph W. Westphal (born 1948), United States Under Secretary of the Army
Katherine Westphal (born 1919), American textile designer
Michael Westphal (1965–1991), tennis player for West Germany
Otto Carl Friedrich Westphal (1800–1879), prominent physician and author on the human eye and on optics
Karl Friedrich Otto Westphal (1833–1890), German neurologist and psychiatrist, son of Otto Carl Friedrich Westphal
Alexander Carl Otto Westphal (1863–1941), German physician, son of Carl Friedrich Otto and grandson of Otto Carl Friedrich Westphal
Paul Westphal (1950-2021), American basketball player and former head coach of the Sacramento Kings
Rudolf Westphal (born 1826), German classical scholar
Siegfried Westphal (1902–1982), German general
Søren Westphal (born 1986), Danish handballer
Wilhelm Westphal (1882–1978), German physicist

Westphal may also refer to:
20D/Westphal, a periodic comet
Westphal, Nova Scotia

See also
Westfall (disambiguation)
Antoinette Westphal College of Media Arts and Design, a college of Drexel University, Philadelphia
Edinger–Westphal nucleus, the accessory parasympathetic cranial nerve nucleus of the oculomotor nerve (cranial nerve III), supplying the constricting muscles of the Iris
Westphal balance, scientific instrument for measuring the density of liquids
Westphal-Schmidt House, National Register of Historic Places listing in Davenport, Iowa, United States
Westphal's sign, the clinical correlate of the absence or decrease of patellar reflex or knee jerk

Ethnonymic surnames